Bocono River is a river of Venezuela. It is part of the Orinoco River basin. It was subject to the Cojedes-Sarare Irrigation System project in 1962, which led to the irrigation of around 148,000 acres of land.

See also
List of rivers of Venezuela

References

Rivers of Venezuela